Lieģi (also Jaunlieģi)  is a village in Tadaiķi Parish, South Kurzeme Municipality, Latvia.

Towns and villages in Latvia
South Kurzeme Municipality
Courland